Álvaro Gabriel López Molinari (born August 24, 1983 in San Carlos), known as Gabriel López, is a Uruguayan footballer currently playing as a striker for Universidad Autónoma del Caribe of the Colombian Categoría Primera B.

Teams
  River Plate 2006
  Atenas 2007–2009
  Sud América 2009
  Cobreloa 2010
  Deportes Concepción 2010
  Montevideo Wanderers 2010
  ESPOLI 2011
  El Tanque Sisley 2011–2012
  Universidad Autónoma 2012–present

References
 
 

1983 births
Living people
People from San Carlos, Uruguay
Uruguayan footballers
Uruguayan expatriate footballers
Club Atlético River Plate (Montevideo) players
Atenas de San Carlos players
Sud América players
Montevideo Wanderers F.C. players
Cobreloa footballers
Deportes Concepción (Chile) footballers
C.D. ESPOLI footballers
El Tanque Sisley players
Categoría Primera B players
Expatriate footballers in Chile
Expatriate footballers in Ecuador
Expatriate footballers in Colombia
Association football forwards